Kiowa Township, Kansas may refer to:

 Kiowa Township, Barber County, Kansas
 Kiowa Rural Township, Kiowa County, Kansas

See also 
 Kiowa Township (disambiguation)

Kansas township disambiguation pages